Chakkere is a village in Ramanagara district, Channapatna Taluk, Karnataka, India.

Villages in Ramanagara district